The Chatfield Public Library is a public library in Chatfield, Minnesota. It is a member of Southeastern Libraries Cooperating, the SE Minnesota library region.

The building, a Prairie School structure, is listed on the National Register of Historic Places.

Hours 
Tuesday 10:00am – 6:30pm 
Wednesday 10:00am – 6:30pm 
Thursday 10:00am – 8:30pm 
Friday 9:00am – 5:00pm 
Saturday 9:00am – 2:00pm

References

External links

Online Catalog

Library buildings completed in 1913
Buildings and structures in Fillmore County, Minnesota
Carnegie libraries in Minnesota
Education in Fillmore County, Minnesota
Libraries on the National Register of Historic Places in Minnesota
Prairie School architecture in Minnesota
1913 establishments in Minnesota
National Register of Historic Places in Fillmore County, Minnesota